(English: Morandi Bridge), officially  (English: Polcevera Viaduct), was a road viaduct in Genoa, Liguria, Italy, constructed between 1963 and 1967 along the A10 motorway over the Polcevera River, from which it derived its official name. It connected Genoa's Sampierdarena and Cornigliano districts across the Polcevera Valley. The bridge was widely called "Ponte Morandi" after its structural designer, engineer Riccardo Morandi.

On 14 August 2018, a  section of the viaduct collapsed during a rainstorm, killing forty-three people. The collapse led to a year-long state of emergency in the Liguria region, extensive analysis of the structural failure, and widely varying assignment of responsibility.

The remains of the original bridge were demolished in June 2019. The replacement bridge, the Genoa-Saint George Bridge was inaugurated a year later.

History

Design
Ponte Morandi was designed by civil engineer Riccardo Morandi, from whom its unofficial name was derived. It was a cable-stayed bridge characterised by a prestressed concrete structure for the piers, pylons and deck, very few stays, as few as two per span, and a hybrid system for the stays constructed from steel cables with prestressed concrete shells poured on. The bridge was similar to Morandi's earlier 1957 design for the General Rafael Urdaneta Bridge in Venezuela except for the stays, which on the Venezuelan bridge are not covered with prestressed concrete.

Construction

The viaduct was built between 1963 and 1967 by the Società Italiana per Condotte d'Acqua, costing 3.8 billion Italian lire and opened on 4 September 1967. It featured diagonal cable stays, with the vertical trestle-like supports made up of sets of Vs, one set carrying the roadway deck, while the other pair of inverted Vs supported the top ends of two pairs of diagonal stay cables.

The viaduct was officially opened on 4 September 1967 in the presence of Italian President Giuseppe Saragat.

Maintenance and strengthening 

The bridge had been subject to continual restoration work from the 1970s due to an incorrect initial assessment of the effects of creep of the concrete. This resulted in excessive deferred displacement of the vehicle deck so that it was neither level nor flat; at the worst points, it undulated in all three dimensions. Only after continual measurement, redesign, and associated structural work was the vehicle deck considered acceptable, approaching horizontal by the mid-1980s.

In a 1979 report, Morandi himself said "I thinck [sic] that sooner or later, may be in a few years, it will be necessary to resort to a treatment consisting of the removal of all traces of rust on the exposure of the reinforcements, to fill the patches, with epoxidic style resins, and finally to cover everything up with elastomers of very high chemical resistance".

In the 1990s, the tendons (the steel wires, cables, and threaded bars, designed to produce the bridge's prestressed concrete) on pillar 11 appeared to be most damaged. About 30% of the tendons had corroded away. As of the collapse of the bridge, only pillar 11 had been internally inspected in the 1990s, showing severed and oxidized strands. From 1990 onward, the easternmost pillar 11 had its stays strengthened by flanking them with external steel cables. Pillar 10 had the stays at the top strengthened with steel sheathing in the 1990s. Following the collapse, many questions have been raised about the stays. Morandi's similar bridge in Venezuela suffered one or more stay cable failures in 1979/1980, with collapse imminent.

The minister of infrastructures and transport in charge until 1 June 2018, Graziano Delrio, was informed multiple times in the Italian parliament during 2016  that the Morandi bridge needed maintenance.

In 2017, a confidential university report in Genoa noted severe disparities in the behaviour of the stays of the pillar 9, which would collapse. The minutes of a February 2018 government meeting report that resistance and reflectometry measurements indicated an "average" reduction of the cross-section of the tendons of 10 to 20%. A crack in the road had appeared at least 14 days before the collapse, near the southeastern stay of the subsequently collapsed pillar 9. The crack may have been an indication that the stay had stretched. At no point was a suggestion made to reduce the load on the bridge. Traditionally, bridges were designed for a 50-year lifespan; the bridge failed just under 51 years after its opening.

On 3 May 2018, the Autostrade company had announced a call for tenders for a structural upgrade of the viaduct to the value of €20,159,000, with a deadline of 11 June 2018. The work on the reinforcement of the stays on pillars 9 and 10 would have needed to be finished within five years.

Workers were installing new heavy concrete Jersey barriers on the Ponte Morandi before it collapsed, reducing the already low-compressive prestress on the concrete of the stays and increasing the loads.

2017 modal analyses

In 2017, Carmelo Gentile and Antonello Ruccolo of the Polytechnic University of Milan studied the modal frequencies and deformations of the stays of the bridge. On pillar 9, they could identify only four global modes, and the deformations of two of these identified modes were not fully compliant. Modal frequencies were more than 10% different, specifically on the southern stays. In pre-stressed concrete beams, such a difference could represent the entire effect of the non-linear pre-stresses. As little as a 2% shift could represent severe damage. The prestress in the Ponte Morandi was characterised as relatively small from the start. In contrast, with bare tendons, which are relatively under-constrained like the strings in a piano, the effect of prestress is dominant in determining the resonant frequency. Other than prestress, changes in geometry, such as corrosion in the tendons, could impact the resonant frequency. The effects would be reduced by the composite nature of the stays when observing global modes. Gentile had performed similar modal analyses on pillar 11 in the 1990s. Other related methods were applied on the stays of Ponte Morandi in the 1990s, such as reflectometry, which was able to measure the tension, but not strength of the tendons.

Replacement proposals
By the mid-2000s, the A10 route through Genoa and over the bridge had become highly congested. The city council requested proposals for improvement of traffic flow through Genoa, with the Autostrade company in 2009 proposing the "Gronda di Ponente" project to improve flow, by moving traffic to a newly built Autostrada interchange system located to the north of the city. As part of the initial study and report, the Autostrade company measured that the bridge carried 25.5 million transits a year, with traffic having quadrupled in the previous 30 years and "destined to grow, even in the absence of intervention, by a further 30% in the next 30 years". The study highlighted how the traffic volume, with daily queues at peak hours joining the Autostrada Serravalle, produced "an intense degradation of the bridge structure subjected to considerable stress", with the need for continuous maintenance. The study showed that, in the option for improving what was termed as the "low gutter", it would be more economical to replace the bridge with a new one north of its current location, and then to demolish the existing bridge.

Collapse

On 14 August 2018, around 11:36 local time (09:36 UTC), during a torrential rainstorm, a  section of Ponte Morandi collapsed. The collapsed span was centred on the westernmost cable-stayed pillar, pillar 9, and crossed the Polcevera, as well as an industrial area of Sampierdarena. Eyewitnesses reported that the bridge was hit by lightning before it collapsed. Between 30 and 35 cars and three trucks were reported to have fallen from the bridge.

A large part of the collapsed bridge and the vehicles on it fell into the rain-swollen Polcevera. Other parts landed on the tracks of the Turin–Genoa and Milan–Genoa railways, and on warehouses belonging to Ansaldo Energia, an Italian power engineering company. The latter were serendipitously largely empty because the collapse occurred on the eve of a major Italian public holiday, .

The initial hypotheses were that a structural weakness or a landslide caused the collapse. The bridge was reportedly undergoing maintenance at the time of the collapse, including strengthening the road foundations.

The southern stays reportedly gave way explosively due to corrosion and damage. With only four stays, one of them giving way might have been enough for the structure to lose stability. A preliminary investigative report suggested the pillar itself may have collapsed first, but Genoa prosecutors had not provided the report's authors with a local video showing the southern stays gave way first. There is speculation that lightning may have struck the stays, or a landslide could have destabilised the base.

In July 2019, a video showing the fall of the bridge was made public. It originated from the nearby Ferrometal company cameras, showing that both southern stays and locally attached road sections at pillar 9 started dropping virtually simultaneously. From the movement of the top crossbeam, the tension cables of the southeastern stay apparently gave way. Immediately, the complete road on the pillar and soon after also the pillar itself fell. However, Autostrade, the company that maintained the bridge, objected that the video still does not show all bridge structures, so it does not really explain the cause.

At the time of the collapse, the bridge was managed by Atlantia S.p.A. (formerly Autostrade S.p.A.), a holding company operating toll motorways and airports, which is controlled by the Benetton family. The family waited two days to release a company public statement offering condolences to victims and their families.

The disaster caused a major political controversy about the poor state of infrastructure in Italy and raised wider questions about the condition of bridges across Europe.
According to the Corriere della Sera, this was the 11th bridge collapse in Italy since 2013.

It was later decided that the bridge would not be repaired, but demolished. Demolition began in February 2019 and was completed on 28 June 2019.

Victims and rescue efforts 
Forty-three people were confirmed dead and 16 injured. The dead were 29 citizens of Italy, four from France, three from Chile, two from Albania, and one each from Colombia, Jamaica, Moldova, Peru, and Romania.
Multiple survivors were transported to nearby hospitals, many in critical condition. Davide Capello, the former goalkeeper for Cagliari, survived without injury and was able to walk away from his car, even though it dropped  before becoming wedged between parts of the fallen bridge.

The area under the remaining part of the bridge, including several homes, was evacuated. As of 02:00 the following day (midnight UTC), 12 people were known still to be missing, and voices could be heard calling from underneath the debris; rescue efforts were continuing by floodlight using techniques commonly deployed after earthquakes.

Aftermath and reactions 
The railways connecting Genoa Sampierdarena (and ) with Genoa Borzoli and Genoa Rivarolo were closed immediately as a result of the bridge's collapse. A rail replacement bus service was established between the stations.

The day after the collapse, Prime Minister Giuseppe Conte declared a state of emergency for the Liguria region, which would last for a year. According to deputy minister of infrastructure Edoardo Rixi, the entire bridge would be demolished.

The Italian Football Federation announced that a minute of silence would be held for the victims of the collapse before all football events across the country during the weekend that followed the incident. On 16 August, the Lega Serie A postponed the opening 2018–19 Serie A matches for both Genoese association football clubs Genoa and Sampdoria that were originally scheduled for 19 August.

Italian transport minister Danilo Toninelli, who had started in office on 1 June 2018, described the incident as "an immense tragedy", but it was pointed out that his Five Star Movement political party had said in 2012 that the risk of a collapse of Morandi Bridge was just a silly fairy tale, because "the bridge would have lasted another hundred years", quoting a 2009 evaluation by Autostrade.

Governor Giovanni Toti said that the loss of the bridge was an "incident of vast proportions on a vital arterial road, not just for Genoa, but for the whole country". The disaster resulted in a drop in the stock price of the road's operator, Atlantia, by 5% the same day and by 25% two days later.

A state funeral was held on 18 August, inside the Fiera di Genova event arena, for 18 victims of the collapse, along with recognition for the firefighters and other rescue workers. Some of the victims' families refused to attend the service and instead hosted private funerals. The funeral was attended by Italian politicians, such as President Sergio Mattarella, Prime Minister Giuseppe Conte, interior minister Matteo Salvini, transport minister Danilo Toninelli, and the secretary of the Democratic Party Maurizio Martina.

In mid-2020, control of the infrastructure company was given back to the government after legislators had reduced the penalty for changing the ownership structure.

In 2021 the footbridge immediately next to the Morandi Bridge (previously called Ponte delle Ratelle) was named Passerella 14 agosto 2018.

Various criminal charges, up to and including manslaughter, were laid against 59 individuals, many of them employees of Autostrade per l’Italia. The most high-profile defendant was Giovanni Castellucci, chief executive of the company at the time of the collapse. The trial began with an initial hearing in July 2022.

Infrastructure 

The collapse raised concerns about the general condition of infrastructure in Europe, with studies in Italy, France, and Germany suggesting that a significant number of bridges are in need of renovation or replacement due to corrosion and structural deterioration. Infrastructure investment in Italy was reduced dramatically after the 2008 financial crisis. A resident of Genoa told reporters: "The central government will scapegoat the bridge company, the company will scapegoat someone else — they're all to blame. We all know how bad our infrastructure is in Italy."

The ruling coalition put pressure on the managers of the road, Autostrade per l'Italia (which is part of the Atlantia group). Deputy Prime Minister Luigi Di Maio claimed that they were "definitely to blame." Minister of the Interior Matteo Salvini also blamed European Union budget rules and limitations on deficit and state debt, to which the European Commission opposed a denial. The position of the Benetton family, whose company owns 30% of Atlantia, has also come under scrutiny. Autostrade per l’Italia's chief executive, Giovanni Castellucci, said that the bridge would be rebuilt within eight months.

Investigative committee 
The investigative committee was to be chaired by Roberto Ferrazza and to have as an expert member Antonio Brencich.  However, these two committee members were immediately criticised for being among the signatories of the February 2018 government report that failed to impose precautionary measures on the weakened bridge. On 23 August 2018, Brencich resigned from the inspection commission, and Minister Danilo Toninelli removed Ferrazza as the chair, for "reasons of opportunity in relation to all the institutions involved in this affair".

NASA satellite data research 

Scientists from NASA's Jet Propulsion Laboratory in Pasadena, California, developed a method of analyzing satellite data to detect millimeter-sized changes. Their analysis suggests that the deck between pier 10 and pier 11 had minimal movements until early 2015, and that between March 2017 and August 2018, a significant increase in structural changes occurred (noting that the collapsed pier is pier 9, without any consequential damage to piers 10 and 11, and the between deck). The research and imagery were forwarded to the Italian authorities for further evaluation.

Symbol 
A Volvo FM truck belonging to Damonte Trasporti S.R.L. and in services for Basko Supermercati, painted in blue and green, became a widely publicised symbol of the disaster because it remained standing almost at the edge of the collapsed section. The 37-year-old driver at the time of the accident recounted to the media how he looked in shock as the bridge busy with dense traffic collapsed in front of him, as he brought his vehicle to a stop and ran back until he reached firm ground.

Demolition and replacement 

The last two cable-stayed pillars (10 and 11) of the bridge were demolished using a tonne of explosives on 28 June 2019. The complete bridge was planned to be removed, along with multiple houses in the surrounding area.

Construction began on the replacement Genoa-Saint George Bridge, designed by Italian Genoese-born architect Renzo Piano, on 25 June 2019, and it was completed in the spring of 2020. It was inaugurated on 3 August 2020.

See also
 List of bridge failures

References

External links

Photo documentation of Ponte Morandi, 8 August 2015
Webcam of the Ponte Morandi, today
Video of collapse
 

2018 disasters in Italy
2018 road incidents
2010s road incidents in Europe
21st century in Genoa
August 2018 events in Italy
Bridge disasters in Italy
Bridge disasters of unknown cause
Bridges completed in 1967
Buildings and structures demolished in 2019
Buildings and structures in Genoa
Cable-stayed bridges in Italy
Road bridges in Italy
Transport in Genoa
Morandi
Former bridges in Italy
Bridges in Genoa